Ursavini is an extinct tribe of mammals of the family Ursidae (bears) endemic to North America, Europe, Africa, and Asia during Miocene through Pliocene, living from  about 23—2.5 Mya, existing for roughly 20.5 million years.

Ursavini was assigned to the  Ursinae by Hunt (1998) and Jin et al. (2007) and includes the genera Agriotherium and Ursavus. However in a 2014 paper published on the origins of bears, found Agriotherium to be closer to extant bears and some species of Ursavus might warrant to be in a separate but related genus Ballusia.

References

Bears
Mammal tribes